Game is a 2014 Indian Bengali-language action thriller film directed by Baba Yadav and produced and distributed by  Reliance Entertainment and Grassroot Entertainment Pvt. Ltd. The film features actors Jeet,  Subhashree Ganguly and Saurav Chakraborty in the lead roles. Music of the film has been composed by Jeet Gannguli. The film is a remake of the 2012 Tamil film Thuppakki. The film did a very good collection in worldwide.

Plot
Abhimanyu Chatterjee, a captain in the Indian Army, returns to Kolkata from Kashmir on vacation. On his arrival, his parents and younger sisters force him to see Trisha, who they choose for him to be married to. At the bride-viewing ceremony, Abhimanyu makes up excuses to avoid marrying her, which includes commenting about her being old-fashioned. On the contrary, Trisha is a college-level boxer, which is completely modern in her outlook. Abhimanyu realises this and proposes to her, which she reciprocates.

One day, while travelling around the city with his police officer-friend Santilal, Abhimanyu witnesses the explosion of a bus in which they had travelled. He manages to capture the man who laid the bomb, but he escapes from the hospital where he was kept under custody.  kidnaps the bomber again, and also forces the police officer who helped the bomber's escape, to commit suicide. Abhimanyu soon learns that the bomber is a mere executor, a sleeper cell, whose only role was to plant the bomb. He also discovers that the Islamic terrorist group Harkat-ul-Jihad al-Islami, which the bomber belongs to, has planned various such attacks in the city in a couple of days. Enlisting the help of his fellow Army men and Shantilal, Abhimanyu manages to thwart these attacks and kill the sleeper cell leader's brother and eleven other terrorists, including the first sleeper cell.

When the leader of the terrorist group learns about the role of Abhimanyu in the failure of the terrorist attack, he begins to target the families of the army men, except Abhimanyu, by kidnapping someone close to them. When Abhimanyu realises the plan, he substitutes one of the people to be kidnapped, with his younger sister . Using his pet dog and his sister's Dupatta, he manages to reach the terrorists' hideout, rescuing his sister, who was about to be killed after Abhimanyu's bluff was exposed, and the other victims and eliminating the terrorists assembled there. Asif Ali, the second-in-command of the sleeper cells, is captured and killed by Abhimanyu.

When this attack fails, the terrorist leader decides to target Abhimanyu himself. He asks Abhimanyu to surrender to him or else there would be more terrorist attacks. Abhimanyu decides to sacrifice his life and devises a plan with his fellow army men. Ahimanyu meets the leader in a ship, which has been rigged with a bomb planted by Abhimanyu's friend. When he learns about the leader's plan, however, which is to expose Abhimanyu's army team as terrorists and knowing about a Muslim terrorist in the Indian defence — Vinod Sharma, he fights the leader and escapes with him in a boat. After the ship explodes, he kills the leader. Abhimanyu confronts Vinod Sharma and forces him to commit suicide, and later returns to Kashmir with his team.

Cast 
 Jeet as Abhimanyu Chatterjee, captain in DIA, a wing of Indian Army.
 Subhashree Ganguly as Trisha, a boxer.
 Sudipto Balav as Inspector Shantilal, Abhimanyu's best friend
 Saurav Chakrabarti as Sleeper Cell's Leader, who plans 12 bomb blasts in Kolkata
 Shankar Chakraborty as Dibakar Panda, Abhimanyu's Senior Commanding Officer.
 Arindam Sil as Vinod Sharma, DIA Secretary
 Biswajit Chakraborty as Abhimanyu's father 
 Moushumi Saha as Abhimanyu's mother 
 Subhashish Mukherjee as Trisha's father (Cameo Appearance)
 Arindol Bagchi as ACP Raghav Sen
 Yusuf Chishti as Abhimanyu’s friend in the Army who is part of the team that kills the terrorists

Production

The film's production commenced in 2013, and The soundtrack is composed by Jeet Gannguli,  The trailer of the Game released on 2 May 2014 and got a bumper response both from critics and the audience.
According to the director Baba Yadav, Jeet's role is that of an Army officer for which Jeet lost some weight to fit in the role and to look 6 years younger from his real biological age. Jeet also sported a crew-cut hairstyle for his role.
Whilst Subhasree will play the role of boxer and Abhimanyu (Jeet's) love interest, Trisha.

Soundtrack

See also
 Thuppakki 2012 film in Tamil.
 Holiday: A Soldier Is Never Off Duty 2014 film in Hindi.

References

External links
 

Bengali-language Indian films
2010s Bengali-language films
2014 films
Indian action thriller films
Bengali remakes of Tamil films
Films about military personnel
Indian Army in films
Films set in Kolkata
Films shot in Kolkata
Reliance Entertainment films
Films directed by Baba Yadav
2014 action thriller films
Films scored by Jeet Ganguly